Rippe is a surname. Notable people with this surname include:

 Albert de Rippe (1500–1551), Italian musician
 James Rippe (born 1947), American cardiologist
 Jan Rippe (born 1955), Swedish actor, singer, and comedian
 Siegbert Rippe (born 1936), Uruguayan lawyer

See also
 La Rippe, Switzerland